PAUS are a Portuguese rock band from Lisbon, formed in 2009. The band currently consists of Fábio Jevelim (vocals, keyboards), Makoto Yagyu (vocals, bass), Hélio Morais (vocals, drums) and Joaquim Albergaria (vocals, drums). 

PAUS are noted for using a "siamese drum set". The band's sound is influenced by a variety of styles, including math rock, krautrock, progressive rock and African music. Their 2018 album Madeira reached number-one in the Portuguese album charts.

Members 
Current members

 Hélio Morais – vocals, drums (2009–present)
 Joaquim Albergaria – vocals, drums (2009–present)
 Makoto Yagyu – vocals, bass (2009—present)
 Fábio Jevelim – vocals, keyboards (2012–present)

Past members

 João "Shela" Pereira – vocals, keyboards (2009–2012)

Discography

Studio albums

Extended plays 

 É Uma Água (2010)

References

External links 

 Facebook page

Portuguese rock music groups
Portuguese alternative rock groups
Musical quartets
Musical groups established in 2009
2009 establishments in Portugal